Du Wenyang (born 28 January 1990) is a Chinese footballer who currently plays for Beijing Renhe in the China League One.

Club career 
Du Wenyang started his professional football career in 2008 when he joined China League Two side Hebei Tiangong. He joined Chinese Super League side Liaoning Whowin in 2011. On 11 May 2011, he made his senior debut in the second round of 2011 Chinese FA Cup with a 1–0 home win against Shenzhen Phoenix. Although playing another FA Cup match against Shaanxi Chanba on 26 May 2011, Du failed to establish himself within the team. He was loaned to League Two club Shandong Tengding and Dalian Transcendence in the 2013 and 2014 season, respectively.

On 17 February 2015, Du transferred to China League One side Hebei China Fortune. He made his debut for Hebei on 14 March 2015 in a 1–0 home defeat against Beijing BIT. He played 22 league matches in the season as Hebei China Fortune won promotion to the Chinese Super League by finishing the runners-up in the league. He made gus Super League debut on 23 September 2016, in a 1–1 home draw against Chongqing Lifan, coming on as a substitute for Luo Senwen in the 88th minute. Du was sent to the reserved team in 2017. He returned to the first team in the 2018 season, and played in every minute for the club in the last five matches of the season. On 7 November 2018, he scored an own goal in a 2–1 away defeat against Guangzhou R&F.

On 27 February 2019, Du joined Chinese Super League side Beijing Renhe.

Career statistics 
.

References

External links
 

Living people
1990 births
People from Zaozhuang
Association football defenders
Chinese footballers
Footballers from Shandong
Liaoning F.C. players
Hebei F.C. players
Dalian Transcendence F.C. players
Beijing Renhe F.C. players
Chinese Super League players
China League One players
China League Two players